"U Make My Sun Shine" is a song by Prince, released on April 10, 2001. The ballad is a duet with guest vocalist Angie Stone, and along with the B-side was reportedly one of the tracks from Prince's cancelled High album.

"When Will We B Paid?", is a cover version of a 1970 song by the Staple Singers, originally titled "When Will We Be Paid". While The Staple Singers' version is somewhat upbeat musically, Prince's take is a sparse number with lyrics delivered with sadness and anger. The music is almost dirge-like, but features a searing guitar solo to further emphasize the anger. The song concerns the mistreatment and lack of appreciations for black people in the United States. Prince performed the song during his 2001 Hit N Run Tour, segueing it from "Purple Rain".

Music video
Prince and Angie Stone, as well as some other NPG members at the time, can be seen singing against a blue, partly cloudy background.

Charts

References

2001 singles
Pop ballads
Prince (musician) songs
Male–female vocal duets
Songs written by Prince (musician)
NPG Records singles
Song recordings produced by Prince (musician)
2000 songs